Q series can refer to:

 Bombardier Q series (Dash 8) – aircraft
 IdeaCentre Q series – nettop computers
 Pentax Q series – cameras
 In mathematics
 q-Pochhammer symbol q-series
 Hypergeometric q-series

See also
 P series (disambiguation)
 R series (disambiguation)